Armenia is a sovereign state in the South Caucasus region of Eurasia. Located in Western Asia, on the Armenian Highland, it is bordered by Turkey to the west, Georgia to the north, the de facto independent Republic of Artsakh and Azerbaijan to the east, and Iran and Azerbaijan's exclave of Nakhchivan to the south.

The economy of Armenia benefits strongly from investment and support of Armenians abroad.

Before independence, Armenia's economy was largely industry-based – chemicals, electronics, machinery, processed food, synthetic rubber, and textile – and highly dependent on outside resources. The republic had developed a modern industrial sector, supplying machine tools, textiles, and other manufactured goods to sister republics in exchange for raw materials and energy.

As of January 2019, there are about 40 thousand registered companies with payroll positions.  There are 247 companies with over 250 registered employees. The average wage in these companies amounts to 240 thousand AMD.

Notable firms 
This list includes notable companies with primary headquarters located in the country. The industry and sector follow the Industry Classification Benchmark taxonomy. Organizations which have ceased operations are included and noted as defunct.

Other lists of leading companies 
More banks are included in the list of banks in Armenia.

Each quarter, the largest taxpaying companies are disclosed and published online.  Data may be looked up per industry and company size. E.g. among software development companies, the largest taxpayer between 2014 and 2017 was Synopsis Armenia.

A list of IT sector companies in Armenia can be found on the site of EIF Guide. Meanwhile, the Chamber of Commerce and Industry features a list of leading international technology companies in Armenia. Notable IT companies founded in Armenia include PicsArt, Krisp, and others.

See also
 Economy of Armenia
 List of companies of the Republic of Artsakh

References

Companies of Armenia
Armenian
 
Economy of Armenia